Sphyraena intermedia commonly known as the intermediate barracuda is a species of barracuda that was only recently discovered in the Gulf of Taranto in the south of Italy. Very similar to the other four species of Barracuda that inhabit the Mediterranean Sea particularly the European barracuda and yellowmouth barracuda. They are distinguished by being intermediate in size between European and Yellowmouth barracudas as well as a few other differences such as different amounts of scales and certain body measurements.

References

Sphyraenidae
Fish of the Mediterranean Sea
Fish described in 2009